The Aiways U5 is an all-electric battery-powered compact crossover SUV manufactured by the Chinese company Aiways. It is the first vehicle model from this manufacturer. The production model of the U5 was publicly unveiled at the 2018 Beijing Auto Show. The car was originally previewed as the Aiways U5 ion Concept in 2018.

Production 
Aiways U5 is produced at the company’s manufacturing facility just outside Shangrao, China.

Design 

The exterior styling of the U5 received an update in 2021 although the dimensions remained the same. 

Aiways has previously referred to the design as a “connection between modern craftsmanship and technology for the future”. The U5 exterior design has optimized aerodynamics to give a drag coefficient of 0.29.

Powertrain and batteries 
The Aiways U5 has a 63kWh battery unit and a range of 400 km (410 km in standard trim) according to the WLTP cycle. The battery can be charged from 20% to 80% in 35 minutes using a DC charger or 0% to 100% in 10 hours using a (6.6kW Type 2) AC charger. The battery energy density stands at 172 Wh/kg. 

Aiways has patented a ‘sandwich’ structure battery pack which is made up of 24 high energy density modules supplied by CATL. It has multiple layers which separate the wet (cooling plate) and dry (battery module) areas within the cell. This improves the heating and cooling in the cell and therefore increases capacity (63kWh) and range. This structure is also theoretically safer in the event of a collision as the wet and dry areas cannot mix and cause a short circuit.

The battery pack is paired with a permanent-magnet synchronous electric motor delivering 150 kW (201 hp; 204 PS) of power and 310 Nm (230 lb⋅ft) of torque at up to 16,000 rpm, which allows the U5 to accelerate from 0 to 100 km/h in 7.5 seconds in Standard trim.

Safety

Active safety 
Aiways U5 comes with various Advanced Driver Assistance Systems (ADAS) as standard including:

 Lane Keeping Assist (LKA) - Between 60km/h and 120km/h the system warns the driver if they are about to stray from their lane and makes necessary adjustments to the steering if the driver does not. It also makes an audible warning if the driver’s hands are off the steering wheel for more than eight seconds. 
 Traffic Jam Assistant (TJA) remains active up to 120km/h and automatically handles the cycles of acceleration, braking and restarting as seen during a traffic jam.
 Blind Spot Detection (BSD) system alerts the driver with a sound and a warning light when a vehicle or cyclist is passing alongside the Aiways U5.
 Rear Cross Traffic Alert (RCTA) also warns the driver when another vehicle passes at the rear of the car.
 Emergency Brake Assist (EBA) automatically applies the car’s brakes when a pedestrian, cyclist or vehicle passes in front of the car.
 Forward Collision Warning (FCW) detects vehicles and pedestrians in front of the U5 and makes a warning sound if the vehicle approaches at a speed above 10km/h.
 Adaptive Cruise Control (ACC) maintains a safe space from the vehicle in front and brings the U5 to a halt when the traffic ahead stops.
 Intelligent High Beam Control (IHBC) automatically operates the vehicles high-beam headlights
 Parking Assistant - automatically manoeuvres the vehicle into a parking space.

Passive safety 

 Optimized airbag deployment 
 A collision-activated circuit breaker unlocks all doors, activates the hazard lights and shuts off power to all electrical circuits in the event of a collision.

Infotainment 

The Aiways U5 has a large dashboard with a 12.3-inch tablet style screen to access the vehicle and infotainment systems. There is an 8-speaker audio system with DAB+  and traditional radio functionality.

Specifications 
The Aiways U5 comes in Standard and Premium versions.

Charging

Home 
Charging from 20% to 100% takes 8 hours using a (6.6kW Type 2) AC charger.

Out of home 
The battery can be charged from 30% to 80% in 27 minutes using a DC charger.

History
The Aiways U5 production model was publicly unveiled at the 2018 Beijing Auto Show. The car was originally previewed as the Aiways U5 ion Concept in 2018. The Aiways U5 was expected to have a starting price of 197,900 yuan to 292,100 yuan.

European launch

In January 2020, the U5 was planned to be made available to the left-hand-drive European market in April 2020.

, the vehicle is available in the Netherlands and Belgium and shows up in the vehicle registration statistics for both countries. In the Netherlands, the price starts from €39,950.

The Aiways U5 is also available in Germany and France.

As of May 2021 it is available in Denmark.

Asia launch
Aiways Thailand (Aiways and Phoenix EV joint venture) plans to produce Aiways U5 in Thailand by 2023.

See also

 Volkswagen ID.4
 Xpeng G3
 Jaguar I-Pace
 Audi e-tron
 Mercedes-Benz EQC''
 Tesla Model Y
 NIO ES6

References

Euro NCAP small off-road
Aiways
Production electric cars
Cars introduced in 2018